White Trash Renegade is the second solo studio album by American rapper Big B. It was released on April 19, 2005 via Suburban Noize Records.

CD track listing

References

2005 albums
Big B (rapper) albums
Suburban Noize Records albums